is a Japanese politician of the Democratic Party of Japan, and a former member of the House of Councillors in the Diet (national legislature). A native of Tomamae District, Hokkaidō and 1985 graduate of Keio University, he was elected to the House of Councillors for the first time in 2007 after serving in the assembly of Kanagawa Prefecture for three terms from 1995 until 2007.

References

External links 
  in Japanese.

Members of the House of Councillors (Japan)
Keio University alumni
1962 births
Living people
Democratic Party of Japan politicians